John Francis Murphy  (December 11, 1853 – January 30, 1921) was an American Irish landscape painter. His style moved from poetic Tonalism to the innovative application of multiple layers of pigment, in order to create a sparse, brooding landscape, later in his career.

Biography
John Francis Murphy was born at Oswego, New York on December 11, 1853. His father, Martin Francis Murphy (1822-1899) had immigrated from Waterford to Oswego where he married Hannah Gregory (1839-1899). In 1870, he moved to Chicago and became a sign painter then moving to New York City in 1875 where he taught himself painting. In 1887, he built a studio in Arkville, New York and founded the Pakatakan Artist Colony.

He first exhibited at the National Academy of Design in 1876, and was made an associate in 1885 and a full academician two years later. He became a member of the Society of American Artists in 1901 and of the American Watercolor Society. At first influenced by Wyant and Inness, after 1900 he attacked the modern problems of light and air, thus combining the old and new theories of landscape painting. His chief characteristics are extreme refinement and charm, poetic sentiment, and beauty of surface. His composition is simple and his rendering of soil unique. A past master of values, he preferred the quiet and subdued aspects of nature. He received numerous awards, including a gold medal at Charleston in 1902 and the Inness medal in 1910.

He died on January 30, 1921, of pneumonia in New York City.

Gallery
.

Works
Representative examples of his work are:  
 October (Corcoran Gallery of Art, Washington)
 The Path to the Village (National Gallery of Art, Washington)
 Indian Summer (National Gallery of Art, Washington)
 Indian Summer Oaks, 1887 (Cahoon Museum of American Art, Cotuit, Massachusetts)
 The Old Barn (Metropolitan Museum, New York)
 The Hill Top (Art Institute of Chicago)
 Afternoon Lights on the Hills (Carnegie Institute, Pittsburgh)
 Neglected Lands (Buffalo Academy)
 Twilight
 Late September
 Golden Autumn (National Cowboy & Western Heritage Museum, Oklahoma City)
 The River Farm
 Tints of a Vanished Past, awarded the 1885 Second Hallgarten Prize by the National Academy of Design.
 Golden Autumn, 1898 (Salmagundi Club, New York)

References

Sources
 Cahoon Museum of American Art: https://web.archive.org/web/20120326172806/http://www.cahoonmuseum.org/american-impressionism.php
 Sherman, Frederic Fairchild, American Painters of Yesterday and Today, 1919, Priv. print in New York. Chapter: Miniature landscapes by J. Francis Murphy: https://archive.org/stream/americanpainters00sheriala#page/n17/mode/2up

External links
Paintings by J. Francis Murphy, an exhibition catalog from The Metropolitan Museum of Art Libraries (fully available online as PDF)

1853 births
1921 deaths
American people of Irish descent
19th-century American painters
19th-century American male artists
American male painters
20th-century American painters
American landscape painters
People from Oswego, New York
American Impressionist painters
Tonalism
20th-century American male artists